Showbiz Moms & Dads is an American reality television series which premiered on April 13, 2004, on the Bravo cable network.  The series featured children and their parents who aspired to success in entertainment.

The network subsequently aired several similar shows, including Showdog Moms & Dads and Sports Kids Moms & Dads.

Cast 
The reality series followed these families:
The Barrons: Jordan, a 14-year-old aspiring actress  and her mother.
The Klingensmiths: Shane, a 13-year-old aspiring singer and actor and his mother.
The Moseley-Stephens: Jordan, an 8-year-old actress and her mother.
The Nutters: A family of seven aspiring child and teenage actors. The children and their parents later appeared on The Oprah Winfrey Show and the father, Duncan Nutter, was a contestant on Battle of the Network Reality Stars.
The Tyes: Emily, a 4-year-old beauty pageant contestant and her mother.

References

External links 
 
 

2000s American reality television series
2004 American television series debuts
2004 American television series endings
Bravo (American TV network) original programming